Justice Daly may refer to:

Edward J. Daly, associate justice of the Connecticut Supreme Court
Gene B. Daly, associate justice of the Montana Supreme Court

See also
Joseph E. Daily, associate justice of the Illinois Supreme Court
Rudolph J. Daley, associate justice of the Vermont Supreme Court